The Nokia 2720 Flip is a Nokia-branded flip phone developed by HMD Global. The 2720 Flip was created as an updated version of the Nokia 2720 Fold which debuted in 2009. It was unveiled at IFA 2019 together with the Nokia 110, Nokia 800 Tough, Nokia 6.2, and Nokia 7.2.
It runs the KaiOS operating system, a web-based operating system based on B2G OS.

Target Audience 
The Nokia 2720 flip is targeted at people wanting to have a 'Digital Detox', people in developing areas of the world where smartphones are not practical and people who want a throwback of nostalgia.

Software 
The Nokia 2720 Flip runs on the web-based operating system KaiOS. It runs many modern apps such as WhatsApp, Facebook, Google Assistant and YouTube to name a few.

References

2720 Flip
Mobile phones introduced in 2019
Mobile phones with user-replaceable battery